Bugadihalli  is a village in the southern state of Karnataka, India. It is located in the Nelamangala taluk of Bangalore Rural district.

Demographics 
Bugadihalli had population of 667 of which 364 are males while 303 are females as per report released by Census India 2011.

Geography 
The total geographical area of village is 216.13 hectares.

Bus Route from Bengaluru City 
Yeshwantapura - Darasahalli - Nelamangala

See also 

 Heggunda
 Bengaluru Rural District

References

External links 

Villages in Bangalore Rural district